Roa Station is a railway station in Roa, Norway on the Gjøvik Line. It is served by Oslo Commuter Rail line trains operated by Vy Gjøvikbanen. The station was opened in 1909 as part of the new Roa–Hønefoss Line that connects the Bergen Line to the Gjøvik Line.

The restaurant was taken over by Norsk Spisevognselskap on 1 January 1926. They originally had plans to expand the restaurant, but this was later terminated.

References

External links 
  Entry at Jernbaneverket <

 Entry at the Norwegian Railway Club 

Railway stations in Lunner
Railway stations on the Gjøvik Line
Railway stations on the Roa–Hønefoss Line
Railway stations opened in 1909
1909 establishments in Norway